Mascotte may refer to:

Mascotte (rolling papers), a Dutch company manufacturing rolling papers
Mascotte, Florida, a small city in the United States
 Mascotte (film), a 1920 German silent film

See also 
 Mascot (disambiguation)